The following is a list of events affecting radio broadcasting in 2017. Events listed include radio program debuts, finales, cancellations, and station launches, closures and format changes, as well as information about controversies.

Notable events

January

February

March

April

May

June

July

August

September

October

November

December

Debuts

Closings

Deaths

References

 
Radio by year